Johan Graham (1705, London – 1775, London), was an 18th-century painter from London active in The Hague and Amsterdam.

Biography
According to the RKD (the Netherlands Institute for Art History), he was born in Londen but lived mostly in the Hague, where he was active at a young age. He travelled to Rome and returned to London but came back to The Hague and was still living there in 1750. He became a member of the Confrerie Pictura in 1742, and was registered as a pupil of Arnold Houbraken, Jacques Ignatius de Roore and Mattheus Terwesten.  Houbraken died in 1718, so he can't have studied with him very long, and in 1719 he travelled to Italy, visiting Bologna, Venice, and Rome. He taught English lessons on the side and is known for wall & ceiling decorations. In 1775 he sold his collection of 136 paintings and moved to London with his elderly sister.

References

1705 births
1775 deaths
18th-century Dutch painters
18th-century Dutch male artists
18th-century English painters
Dutch male painters
Painters from London
Painters from The Hague